Synaphea hians is a shrub endemic to Western Australia.

It usually blooms between July and November producing yellow flowers.

It is found on rises in the South West and Great Southern regions of Western Australia between Busselton and Woodanilling where it grows in sandy soils.

References

Eudicots of Western Australia
hians
Endemic flora of Western Australia
Plants described in 1995